Black Belly of the Tarantula is a 1971 Italian giallo film directed by Paolo Cavara and starring Giancarlo Giannini, Barbara Bouchet, and Barbara Bach.

Plot
Maria is interrupted during a massage by her angry husband, Paolo. He has proof she has been unfaithful to him, though she denies it. That night, someone dressed in black and wearing surgical gloves brutally murders her after injecting her with a chemical that leaves her paralyzed but still conscious. The next day, the inspector assigned to the case, Tellini, questions Paolo. The police find a picture of Maria caressed by a man's hand, but his identity is unknown because half the picture is missing. At home that night, Tellini confesses to his artist wife, Anna, that he doesn't feel cut out for homicide investigations.

Tellini continues to investigate the crime and trace the needles used in the crime to a local doctor. The doctor protests his innocence, and when Tellini leaves the office, he is accosted by Paolo. Paolo too insists he is innocent and plans to conduct his own investigation. The killer strikes again, this time murdering a clothing store owner with no connection to Maria. Tellini visits a scientist acquaintance of the woman, who demonstrates that a species of wasp will use a toxin to paralyze and eviscerate a tarantula to lay its eggs in the corpse. Tellini has the scientist arrested on drug possession charges.

Laura, who owns the spa that Maria patronized the day of her death, phones Mario, who was Maria's lover in the picture. He and Laura take photos of lovers to blackmail them, and she tells him to deliver the last batch of photos of Maria's indiscretions to a woman named Franca. When Mario goes to deliver the package, Tellini and Paolo (who is now working with Tellini) chase him. After a brief struggle with Mario, Paolo falls to his death, but Mario is then run down by a car in the street below. Shortly after being interviewed by Tellini, Franca is murdered. But the police rule that Mario was the killer of all three women. When a tape of Tellini and his wife making love is made public, Tellini again determines to leave the force. But when he is nearly killed in a staged automobile accident, he realizes he needs to solve at least this one last crime.

One of Laura's spa employees, Jenny, resigns in protest of the blackmail ring. Laura obliquely threatens her life, but their conversation is interrupted by the spa's blind masseur. Jenny spends the night at a friend's house but is followed by the killer who brutally murders her, and  then leaves her body in a trash bag to be found the following day. Tellini interviews some of Jenny’s coworkers, including the aloof Laura, a nurse who wears gloves identical to the killer's, and the blind masseur, who takes off his darkened glasses to reveal colorless, unseeing eyes.

That night, Laura telephones Tellini to inform him that she has determined the killer's identity. But when he goes to the spa, he finds her dead, with a colorless contact lens next to her body. Realizing the masseur had been faking his blindness and was indeed the killer, Tellini races home to find the killer attacking Anna. The men struggle, and Tellini subdues him and saves Anna. The next day, a psychiatrist tells Tellini that the masseur had begun faking his sightlessness after killing his unfaithful, sexually voracious wife; he then continued to kill to satisfy his inner demons. Satisfied at solving the case but still disillusioned with police work, Tellini wanders the crowded streets of Rome.

Cast
 Giancarlo Giannini as Inspector Tellini
 Claudine Auger as Laura
 Barbara Bouchet as Maria Zani
 Rossella Falk as Franca Valentino
 Silvano Tranquilli as Paolo Zani
 Annabella Incontrera as Mirta Ricci
 Ezio Marano as Masseur
 Barbara Bach as Jenny
 Stefania Sandrelli as Anna Tellini
 Giancarlo Prete as Mario
 Eugene Walter as Ginetto, the waiter
 Nino Vingelli as Inspector Di Giacomo

Production

Filming
The film was shot on location in Rome, Italy, in 1970.

Music
Ennio Morricone did the music score for the film.

Release

Home media
Blue Underground Entertainment released the film on DVD in 2006.

Legacy
It is one of many Italian giallo films to be inspired by Dario Argento's successful debut thriller The Bird with the Crystal Plumage. Though fairly obscure for many years the film has recently made a comeback thanks to the rising fan base for the giallo genre. The film has gained much praise from the horror community, one writer at Horrorview.com cited it as the best giallo ever made.

Sources
 P. Bondanella, History of italian cinema, 2009
 Luther-Smith, Adrian (1999). Blood and Black Lace: The Definitive Guide to Italian Sex and Horror Movies. Stray Cat Publishing Ltd. p. 9

External links

 

1971 films
1970s Italian-language films
Italian serial killer films
1970s mystery films
1971 horror films
Giallo films
French detective films
Italian detective films
Crime horror films
Mystery horror films
Films scored by Ennio Morricone
1970s crime thriller films
Films directed by Paolo Cavara
Metro-Goldwyn-Mayer films
Italian horror films
Films set in Rome
1970s exploitation films
Films shot in Rome
1970s slasher films
1970s Italian films
1970s French films